The 2013 Washington Nationals season was the Nationals' ninth season for the baseball franchise of Major League Baseball in the District of Columbia, the sixth season at Nationals Park, and the 45th since the original team was started in Montreal, Quebec, Canada.

The Nationals finished the year 2nd place in the National League East division with an 86-76 record, but were unable to return to the postseason after their division-winning 2012 campaign. The 2013 season was also the last with manager Davey Johnson, who retired following the end of the season.

Offseason 

On November 29, 2012, the Nationals traded minor-leaguer Alex Meyer to the Minnesota Twins for Denard Span.

On January 16, 2013, Washington took part in a three-team trade in which the Oakland Athletics sent  A. J. Cole, Blake Treinen, and a player to be named later to the Nationals, the Nationals sent Michael Morse to the Seattle Mariners, and the Mariners sent John Jaso to the Athletics.  The Athletics sent minor-leaguer Ian Krol to the Nationals on March 20, 2013, to complete the trade.

Spring training
The Nationals held their 2013 spring training in Viera, Florida, with home games played at Space Coast Stadium.

Season standings

National League East

National League Wild Card

Record vs. opponents

Opening Day lineup

Notable transactions
 June 11, 2013: The Nationals traded Henry Rodriguez to the Chicago Cubs for minor-leaguer Ian Dickson.
 July 8, 2013: The Nationals traded minor-leaguer Ivan Pineyro and a player to be named later to the Chicago Cubs for Scott Hairston, cash, and a player to be named later.
 July 10, 2013: The Nationals traded a player to be named later to the Pittsburgh Pirates for Brian Jeroloman. Late in the day, the Nationals sent Brian Bocock to the Pirates to complete the trade.
 August 19, 2013: The Nationals purchased David DeJesus from the Chicago Cubs.
 August 23, 2013: The Nationals traded Kurt Suzuki to the Oakland Athletics for minor-leaguer Dakota Bacus and traded David DeJesus to the Tampa Bay Rays for a player to be named later; the Rays sent minor-leaguer Matthew Spann to the Nationals on September 19, 2013, to complete the trade.

Major league debuts
Erik Davis (June 2, 2013)
Taylor Jordan (June 29, 2013)
Nate Karns (May 28, 2013)
Jeff Kobernus (May 25, 2013)
Ian Krol (June 5, 2013)
Anthony Rendon (April 21, 2013)
Tanner Roark (August 7, 2013)
Zach Walters (September 6, 2013)

Culture and entertainment
In January 2013 the Nationals announced that they would add a fifth Racing President to the Presidents Race that took place during every home game. The new president, William Howard Taft ("Bill"), joined the original four Racing Presidents – George Washington ("George"), Thomas Jefferson ("Tom"), Abraham Lincoln ("Abe"), and Theodore Roosevelt ("Teddy") – all of whom had raced since 2006. The addition of Bill honored the real President Taft, who started the tradition of the presidential ceremonial first pitch in 1910 at a Washington Senators game at Griffith Stadium in Washington, D.C., and also is widely credited with having accidentally created the seventh-inning stretch while attending a game. Bill debuted in the Opening Day Presidents Race on April 1, 2013, and won his first race on May 11, going on to win 11 races before the season ended.

Attendance
The Nationals drew  2,652,422 fans at Nationals Park in 2013. Only the 2,731,993 they drew in their first season in Washington in 2005 exceeded it, and it placed them sixth in attendance for the season among the 15 National League teams, their highest attendance ranking for a single season at the time. Their highest attendance at a home game was on April 1, when they drew 45,274 for a game against the Miami Marlins on Opening Day, while their lowest was 24,394 for a game against the Marlins on August 28. Their average home attendance was 32,746 per game, second-highest since their arrival in Washington.

Game log

|- align="center" bgcolor="bbffbb"
| 1 || April 1 || Marlins || 2 – 0 || Strasburg (1-0) || Nolasco (0-1) || Soriano (1) || 45,274 || 1-0
|- align="center" bgcolor="bbffbb"
| 2 || April 3 || Marlins || 3 – 0 || González (1-0) || Slowey (0-1) || Soriano (2) || 26,269 || 2-0
|- align="center" bgcolor="bbffbb"
| 3 || April 4 || Marlins || 6 – 1 || Zimmermann (1-0) || LeBlanc (0-1) || || 25,123 || 3-0
|- align="center" bgcolor="ffbbbb"
| 4 || April 5 || @ Reds || 15 – 0 || Bailey (1-0) || Haren (0-1) || || 28,102 || 3-1
|- align="center" bgcolor="bbffbb"
| 5 || April 6 || @ Reds || 7 – 6 (11) || Stammen (1-0) || Hoover (0-2) || || 34,762 || 4-1
|- align="center" bgcolor="ffbbbb"
| 6 || April 7 || @ Reds || 6 – 3 || Cueto (1-0) || Strasburg (1-1) || Chapman (2) || 32,514 || 4-2
|- align="center" bgcolor="bbffbb"
| 7 || April 9 || White Sox || 8 – 7 || Stammen (2-0) || Peavy (1-1) || Soriano (3) || 24,412 || 5-2
|- align="center" bgcolor="bbffbb"
| 8 || April 10 || White Sox || 5 – 2 || Zimmermann (2-0) || Floyd (0-2) || Soriano (4) || 24,586 || 6-2
|- align="center" bgcolor="bbffbb"
| 9 || April 11 || White Sox || 7 – 4 || Haren (1-1) || Axelrod (0-1) || Soriano (5) || 24,785 || 7-2
|- align="center" bgcolor="ffbbbb"
| 10 || April 12 || Braves || 6 – 4 (10) || O'Flaherty (2-0) || Stammen (2-1) || Kimbrel (5) || 33,130 || 7-3
|- align="center" bgcolor="ffbbbb"
| 11 || April 13 || Braves || 3 – 1 || Hudson (2-0) || Strasburg (1-2) || Kimbrel (6) || 41,992 || 7-4
|- align="center" bgcolor="ffbbbb"
| 12 || April 14 || Braves || 9 – 0 || Maholm (3-0) || González (1-1) || || 39,389 || 7-5
|- align="center" bgcolor="bbffbb"
| 13 || April 15 || @ Marlins || 10 – 3 || Zimmermann (3-0) || LeBlanc (0-3) || || 15,933 || 8-5
|- align="center" bgcolor="ffbbbb"
| 14 || April 16 || @ Marlins || 8 – 2 || Sanabia (2-1) || Haren (1-2) || || 16,200 || 8-6
|- align="center" bgcolor="bbffbb"
| 15 || April 17 || @ Marlins || 6 – 1 || Detwiler (1-0) || Nolasco (0-2) || || 22,302 || 9-6
|- align="center" bgcolor="ffbbbb"
| 16 || April 19 || @ Mets || 7 – 1 || Harvey (4-0) || Strasburg (1-3) || || 26,675 || 9-7
|- align="center" bgcolor="bbffbb"
| 17 || April 20 || @ Mets || 7 – 6 || Clippard (1-0) || Edgin (0-1) || Soriano (6) || 24,325 || 10-7
|- align="center" bgcolor="ffbbbb"
| 18 || April 21 || @ Mets || 2 – 0 || Gee (1-3) || Zimmermann (3-1) || Parnell (2) || 26,225 || 10-8
|- align="center" bgcolor="ffbbbb"
| 19 || April 22 || Cardinals || 3 – 2 || Miller (3-1) || Haren (1-3) || Mujica (2) || 27,263 || 10-9
|- align="center" bgcolor="ffbbbb"
| 20 || April 23 || Cardinals || 2 – 0 || Wainwright (4-1) || Detwiler (1-1) || Mujica (3) || 29,986 || 10-10
|- align="center" bgcolor="ffbbbb"
| 21 || April 24 || Cardinals || 4 – 2 || García (2-1) || Strasburg (1-4) || Mujica (4) || 33,694 || 10-11
|- align="center" bgcolor="bbffbb"
| 22 || April 25 || Reds || 8 – 1 || González (2-1) || Arroyo (2-2) || || 24,748 || 11-11
|- align="center" bgcolor="bbffbb"
| 23 || April 26 || Reds || 1 – 0 || Zimmermann (4-1) || Bailey (1-2) || || 32,995 || 12-11
|- align="center" bgcolor="bbffbb"
| 24 || April 27 || Reds || 6 – 3 || Haren (2-3) || Leake (1-1) || Soriano (7) || 38,903 || 13-11
|- align="center" bgcolor="ffbbbb"
| 25 || April 28 || Reds || 5 – 2 || Cingrani (2-0) || Detwiler (1-2) || Chapman (5) || 36,457 || 13-12
|- align="center" bgcolor="ffbbbb"
| 26 || April 29 || @ Braves || 3 – 2 || Walden (1-0) || Clippard (1-1) || Kimbrel (9) || 22,870 || 13-13
|- align="center" bgcolor="ffbbbb"
| 27 || April 30 || @ Braves || 8 – 1 || Hudson (3-1) || González (2-2) || || 19,243 || 13-14
|-

|- align="center" bgcolor="bbffbb"
| 28 || May 1 || @ Braves || 2 – 0 || Zimmermann (5-1) || Maholm (3-3) || Soriano (8) || 22,460 || 14-14
|- align="center" bgcolor="bbffbb"
| 29 || May 2 || @ Braves || 3 – 1 || Haren (3-3) || Medlen (1-4) || Soriano (9) || 19,806 || 15-14
|- align="center" bgcolor="ffbbbb"
| 30 || May 3 || @ Pirates || 3 – 1 || Burnett (3-2) || Detwiler (1-3) || Grilli (12) || 26,404 || 15-15
|- align="center" bgcolor="bbffbb"
| 31 || May 4 || @ Pirates || 5 – 4 || Clippard (2-1) || Watson (1-1) || Soriano (10) || 29,975 || 16-15
|- align="center" bgcolor="bbffbb"
| 32 || May 5 || @ Pirates || 6 – 2 || González (3-2) || Rodríguez (2-2) || || 24,186 || 17-15
|- align="center" bgcolor="bbbbbb"
| – || May 7 || Tigers || colspan=6| Postponed (rain) Rescheduled for May 9
|- align="center" bgcolor="bbffbb"
| 33 || May 8 || Tigers || 3 – 1 || Zimmermann (6-1) || Sánchez (3-3) || Soriano (11) || 34,893 || 18-15
|- align="center" bgcolor="bbffbb"
| 34 || May 9 || Tigers || 5 – 4 || Haren (4-3) || Fister (4-1) || Soriano (12) || 28,742 || 19-15
|- align="center" bgcolor="bbffbb"
| 35 || May 10 || Cubs || 7 – 3 || Detwiler (2-3) || Samardzija (1-5) || || 37,191 || 20-15
|- align="center" bgcolor="ffbbbb"
| 36 || May 11 || Cubs || 8 – 2 || Jackson (1-5) || Strasburg (1-5) || || 37,116 || 20-16
|- align="center" bgcolor="ffbbbb"
| 37 || May 12 || Cubs || 2 – 1 || Russell (1-0) || Soriano (0-1) || Gregg (6) || 38,788 || 20-17
|- align="center" bgcolor="bbffbb"
| 38 || May 13 || @ Dodgers || 6 – 2 || Zimmermann (7-1) || Beckett (0-5) || || 32,337 || 21-17
|- align="center" bgcolor="ffbbbb"
| 39 || May 14 || @ Dodgers || 2 – 0 || Kershaw (4-2) || Haren (4-4) || Jansen (2) || 51,729 || 21-18
|- align="center" bgcolor="ffbbbb"
| 40 || May 15 || @ Dodgers || 3 – 1 || Greinke (2-0) || Detwiler (2-4) || League (9) || 36,721 || 21-19
|- align="center" bgcolor="bbffbb"
| 41 || May 16 || @ Padres || 6 – 2 || Strasburg (2-5) || Vólquez (3-4) || || 24,234 || 22-19
|- align="center" bgcolor="bbffbb"
| 42 || May 17 || @ Padres || 6 – 5 (10) || Soriano (1-1) || Street (0-3) || Storen (1) || 29,898 || 23-19
|- align="center" bgcolor="ffbbbb"
| 43 || May 18 || @ Padres || 2 – 1 || Stults (4-3) || Zimmermann (7-2) || Street (10) || 33,646 || 23-20
|- align="center" bgcolor="ffbbbb"
| 44 || May 19 || @ Padres || 13 – 4 || Cashner (3-2) || Haren (4-5) || || 27,080 || 23-21
|- align="center" bgcolor="ffbbbb"
| 45 || May 20 || @ Giants || 8 – 0 || Vogelsong (2-4) || Duke (0-1) || || 41,963 || 23-22
|- align="center" bgcolor="ffbbbb"
| 46 || May 21 || @ Giants || 4 – 2 (10) || Affeldt (1-0) || Maya (0-1) || || 41,642 || 23-23
|- align="center" bgcolor="bbffbb"
| 47 || May 22 || @ Giants || 2 – 1 (10) || Clippard (3-1) || Affeldt (1-1) || Soriano (13) || 41,175 || 24-23
|- align="center" bgcolor="bbffbb"
| 48 || May 24 || Phillies || 5 – 2 || Zimmermann (8-2) || Kendrick (4-3) || Soriano (14) || 28,980 || 25-23
|- align="center" bgcolor="ffbbbb"
| 49 || May 25 || Phillies || 5 – 3 || Durbin (1-0) || Storen (0-1) || Papelbon (9) || 38,012 || 25-24
|- align="center" bgcolor="bbffbb"
| 50 || May 26 || Phillies || 6 – 1 || Strasburg (3-5) || Hamels (1-8) || || 39,033 || 26-24
|- align="center" bgcolor="ffbbbb"
| 51 || May 27 || Orioles || 6 – 2 || Hammel (7-2) || González (3-3) || || 41,260 || 26-25
|- align="center" bgcolor="bbffbb"
| 52 || May 28 || Orioles || 9 – 3 || Duke (1-1) || Gausman (0-2) || || 35,664 || 27-25
|- align="center" bgcolor="ffbbbb"
| 53 || May 29 || @ Orioles || 9 – 6 || Johnson (1-1) || Zimmermann (8-3) || Johnson (16) || 39,129 || 27-26
|- align="center" bgcolor="ffbbbb"
| 54 || May 30 || @ Orioles || 2 – 0 || García (2-2) || Haren (4-6) || Johnson (17) || 30,665 || 27-27
|- align="center" bgcolor="bbffbb"
| 55 || May 31 || @ Braves || 3 – 2 || Stammen (3-1) || Teherán (3-2) || Soriano (15) || 36,650 || 28-27
|-

|- align="center" bgcolor="ffbbbb"
| 56 || June 1 || @ Braves || 2 – 1 (10) || Walden (2-1) || Rodríguez (0-1) || || 46,910 || 28-28
|- align="center" bgcolor="ffbbbb"
| 57 || June 2 || @ Braves || 6 – 3 || Maholm (7-4) || Karns (0-1) || Kimbrel (17) || 30,134 || 28-29
|- align="center" bgcolor="bbffbb"
| 58 || June 4 || Mets || 3 – 2 || Clippard (4-1) || Parnell (4-2) || || 31,473 || 29-29
|- align="center" bgcolor="ffbbbb"
| 59 || June 5 || Mets || 10 – 1 || Gee (4-6) || Haren (4-7) || || 36,155 || 29-30
|- align="center" bgcolor="bbbbbb"
| – || June 6 || Mets || colspan=6| Postponed (rain) Rescheduled for July 26 as part of a doubleheader
|- align="center" bgcolor="bbbbbb"
| – || June 7 || Twins || colspan=6| Postponed (rain) Rescheduled for June 9 as part of a doubleheader
|- align="center" bgcolor="ffbbbb"
| 60 || June 8 || Twins || 4 – 3 (11) || Roenicke (2-1) || Stammen (3-2) || Perkins (13) || 41,587 || 29-31
|- align="center" bgcolor="bbffbb"
| 61 || June 9 (1) || Twins || 7 – 0 || Zimmermann (9-3) || Diamond (4-5) || || 38,516 || 30-31
|- align="center" bgcolor="bbffbb"
| 62 || June 9 (2) || Twins || 5 – 4 || Clippard (5-1) || Swarzak (1-2) || Soriano (16) || 27,949 || 31-31
|- align="center" bgcolor="ffbbbb"
| 63 || June 11 || @ Rockies || 8 – 3 || Chacín (4-3) || Haren (4-8) || || 33,736 || 31-32
|- align="center" bgcolor="bbffbb"
| 64 || June 12 || @ Rockies || 5 – 1 || Ohlendorf (1-0) || de la Rosa (7-4) || || 30,304 || 32-32
|- align="center" bgcolor="bbffbb"
| 65 || June 13 || @ Rockies || 5 – 4 || Stammen (4-2) || Bélisle (4-3) || Soriano (17) || 37,017 || 33-32
|- align="center" bgcolor="ffbbbb"
| 66 || June 14 || @ Indians || 2 – 1 || Smith (3-0) || Abad (0-1) || || 30,824 || 33-33
|- align="center" bgcolor="bbffbb"
| 67 || June 15 || @ Indians || 7 – 6 || Storen (1-1) || Pestano (1-2) || Soriano (18) || 33,307 || 34-33
|- align="center" bgcolor="ffbbbb"
| 68 || June 16 || @ Indians || 2 – 0 || Kluber (5-4) || Strasburg (3-6) || Pestano (1) || 21,845 || 34-34
|- align="center" bgcolor="ffbbbb"
| 69 || June 17 || @ Phillies || 5 – 4 || Papelbon (1-0) || Abad (0-2) || || 44,990 || 34-35
|- align="center" bgcolor="ffbbbb"
| 70 || June 18 || @ Phillies || 4 – 2 || Lee (9-2) || Detwiler (2-5) || Papelbon (14) || 38,188 || 34-36
|- align="center" bgcolor="bbffbb"
| 71 || June 19 || @ Phillies || 6 – 2 (11) || Storen (2-1) || Stutes (2-1) || || 39,594 || 35-36
|- align="center" bgcolor="bbffbb"
| 72 || June 20 || Rockies || 5 – 1 || Zimmermann (10-3) || Oswalt (0-1) || || 31,927 || 36-36
|- align="center" bgcolor="bbffbb"
| 73 || June 21 || Rockies || 2 – 1 || Strasburg (4-6) || Corpas (0-2) || Soriano (19) || 34,917 || 37-36
|- align="center" bgcolor="ffbbbb"
| 74 || June 22 || Rockies || 7 – 1 || Chacín (6-3) || Haren (4-9) || || 35,787 || 37-37
|- align="center" bgcolor="ffbbbb"
| 75 || June 23 || Rockies || 7 – 6 || de la Rosa (8-4) || Detwiler (2-6) || Brothers (4) || 39,307 || 37-38
|- align="center" bgcolor="bbffbb"
| 76 || June 25 || Diamondbacks || 7 – 5 || González (4-3) || Cahill (3-9) || Soriano (20) || 30,287 || 38-38
|- align="center" bgcolor="bbffbb"
| 77 || June 26 || Diamondbacks || 3 – 2 || Zimmermann (11-3) || Miley (4-7) || Soriano (21) || 31,172 || 39-38
|- align="center" bgcolor="ffbbbb"
| 78 || June 27 || Diamondbacks || 3 – 2 (11) || Collmenter (4-0) || Stammen (4-3) || Bell (14) || 32,948 || 39-39
|- align="center" bgcolor="bbffbb"
| 79 || June 28 || @ Mets || 6 – 4 || Clippard (6-1) || Parnell (5-4) || Storen (2) || 28,363 || 40-39
|- align="center" bgcolor="ffbbbb"
| 80 || June 29 || @ Mets || 5 – 1 || Gee (6-7) || Jordan (0-1) || || 26,426 || 40-40
|- align="center" bgcolor="bbffbb"
| 81 || June 30 || @ Mets || 13 – 2 || González (5-3) || Wheeler (1-1) || || 33,366 || 41-40
|-

|- align="center" bgcolor="bbffbb"
| 82 || July 1 || Brewers || 10 – 5 || Zimmermann (12-3) || Gallardo (6-8) || || 24,889 || 42-40
|- align="center" bgcolor="ffbbbb"
| 83 || July 2 || Brewers || 4 – 0 || Henderson (3-2) || Storen (2-2) || || 24,897 || 42-41
|- align="center" bgcolor="ffbbbb"
| 84 || July 3 || Brewers || 4 – 1 || Lohse (4-6) || Detwiler (2-7) || Rodríguez (7) || 28,920 || 42-42
|- align="center" bgcolor="bbffbb"
| 85 || July 4 || Brewers || 8 – 5 || Storen (3-2) || Gorzelanny (1-1) || Soriano (22) || 33,221 || 43-42
|- align="center" bgcolor="bbffbb"
| 86 || July 5 || Padres || 8 – 5 || González (6-3) || Cashner (5-4) || Soriano (23) || 33,979 || 44-42
|- align="center" bgcolor="bbffbb"
| 87 || July 6 || Padres || 5 – 4 || Ohlendorf (2-0) || Vincent (2-1) || Soriano (24) || 33,314 || 45-42
|- align="center" bgcolor="bbffbb"
| 88 || July 7 || Padres || 11 – 7 || Strasburg (5-6) || Erlin (1-2) || || 31,483 || 46-42
|- align="center" bgcolor="ffbbbb"
| 89 || July 8 || @ Phillies || 3 – 2 || Lannan (2-3) || Haren (4-10) || Papelbon (19) || 33,061 || 46-43
|- align="center" bgcolor="ffbbbb"
| 90 || July 9 || @ Phillies || 4 – 2 || Hamels (4-11) || Jordan (0-2) || Bastardo (2) || 33,502 || 46-44
|- align="center" bgcolor="bbffbb"
| 91 || July 10 || @ Phillies || 5 – 1 || González (7-3) || Lee (10-3) || || 34,513 || 47-44
|- align="center" bgcolor="ffbbbb"
| 92 || July 11 || @ Phillies || 3 – 1 || Kendrick (8-6) || Zimmermann (12-4) || Papelbon (20) || 40,086 || 47-45
|- align="center" bgcolor="ffbbbb"
| 93 || July 12 || @ Marlins || 8 – 3 || Eovaldi (2-0) || Strasburg (5-7) || || 16,861 || 47-46
|- align="center" bgcolor="ffbbbb"
| 94 || July 13 || @ Marlins || 2 – 1 (10) || Cishek (3-4) || Stammen (4-4) || || 20,057 || 47-47
|- align="center" bgcolor="bbffbb"
| 95 || July 14 || @ Marlins || 5 – 2 (10) || Stammen (5-4) || Cishek (3-5) || Soriano (25) || 19,766 || 48-47
|- style="text-align:center; background:#bbb;"
|colspan=9| All–Star Break (July 15–18)
|- align="center" bgcolor="ffbbbb"
| 96 || July 19 || Dodgers || 3 – 2 || Belisario (4-5) || Soriano (1-2) || Jansen (10) || 39,146 || 48-48
|- align="center" bgcolor="ffbbbb"
| 97 || July 20 || Dodgers || 3 – 1 (10) || Withrow (1-0) || Stammen (5-5) || Jansen (11) || 41,816 || 48-49
|- align="center" bgcolor="ffbbbb"
| 98 || July 21 || Dodgers || 9 – 2 || Kershaw (9-6) || Zimmermann (12-5) || || 34,758 || 48-50
|- align="center" bgcolor="ffbbbb"
| 99 || July 22 || Pirates || 6 – 5 || Morton (2-2) || Haren (4-11) || Mazzaro (1) || 29,200 || 48-51
|- align="center" bgcolor="ffbbbb"
| 100 || July 23 || Pirates || 5 – 1 || Cole (5-3) || Jordan (0-3) || || 32,976 || 48-52
|- align="center" bgcolor="ffbbbb"
| 101 || July 24 || Pirates || 4 – 2 || Liriano (10-4) || Strasburg (5-8) || Melançon (3) || 33,636 || 48-53
|- align="center" bgcolor="bbffbb"
| 102 || July 25 || Pirates || 9 – 7 || Krol (1-0) || Morris (4-4) || || 38,862 || 49-53
|- align="center" bgcolor="ffbbbb"
| 103 || July 26 (1) || Mets || 11 – 0 || Mejía (1-0) || Zimmermann (12-6) || || 33,858 || 49-54
|- align="center" bgcolor="bbffbb"
| 104 || July 26 (2) || Mets || 2 – 1 || Soriano (2-2) || Hawkins (3-2) || || 33,689 || 50-54
|- align="center" bgcolor="bbffbb"
| 105 || July 27 || Mets || 4 – 1 || Haren (5-11) || Gee (7-8) || Soriano (26) || 37,464 || 51-54
|- align="center" bgcolor="bbffbb"
| 106 || July 28 || Mets || 14 – 1 || Jordan (1-3) || Torres (1-2) || || 31,467 || 52-54
|- align="center" bgcolor="ffbbbb"
| 107 || July 30 || @ Tigers || 5 – 1 || Sánchez (9-7) || Strasburg (5-9) || || 41,880 || 52-55
|- align="center" bgcolor="ffbbbb"
| 108 || July 31 || @ Tigers || 11 – 1 || Verlander (11-8) || González (7-4) || || 40,894 || 52-56
|-

|- align="center" bgcolor="bbffbb"
| 109 || August 2 || @ Brewers || 4 – 1 || Zimmermann (13-6) || Fígaro (1-3) || Soriano (27) || 34,824 || 53-56
|- align="center" bgcolor="bbffbb"
| 110 || August 3 || @ Brewers || 3 – 0 || Haren (6-11) || Hand (0-3) || Soriano (28) || 35,690 || 54-56
|- align="center" bgcolor="ffbbbb"
| 111 || August 4 || @ Brewers || 8 – 5 || Axford (5-4) || Abad (0-3) || Henderson (15) || 35,055 || 54-57
|- align="center" bgcolor="ffbbbb"
| 112 || August 5 || Braves || 3 – 2 || Carpenter (3-0) || Clippard (6-2) || Walden (1) || 33,002 || 54-58
|- align="center" bgcolor="ffbbbb"
| 113 || August 6 || Braves || 2 – 1 || Teherán (9-5) || González (7-5) || Kimbrel (35) || 30,875 || 54-59
|- align="center" bgcolor="ffbbbb"
| 114 || August 7 || Braves || 6 – 3 || Medlen (9-10) || Mattheus (0-1) || Kimbrel (36) || 29,114 || 54-60
|- align="center" bgcolor="bbffbb"
| 115 || August 9 || Phillies || 9 – 2 || Haren (7-11) || Lannan (3-5) || || 27,831 || 55-60
|- align="center" bgcolor="bbffbb"
| 116 || August 10 || Phillies || 8 – 5 || Roark (1-0) || Diekman (0-3) || Soriano (29) || 32,676 || 56-60
|- align="center" bgcolor="bbffbb"
| 117 || August 11 || Phillies || 6 – 0 || Strasburg (6-9) || Kendrick (10-9) || || 32,355 || 57-60
|- align="center" bgcolor="bbffbb"
| 118 || August 13 || Giants || 4 – 2 || Roark (2-0) || Moscoso (1-1) || Soriano (30) || 27,304 || 58-60
|- align="center" bgcolor="bbffbb"
| 119 || August 14 || Giants || 6 – 5 || Zimmermann (14-6) || Lincecum (6-12) || Soriano (31) || 30,657 || 59-60
|- align="center" bgcolor="ffbbbb"
| 120 || August 15 || Giants || 4 – 3 || López (2-2) || Soriano (2-3) || Romo (29) || 36,719 || 59-61
|- align="center" bgcolor="ffbbbb"
| 121 || August 16 || @ Braves || 3 – 2 (10) || Downs (4-3) || Krol (1-1) || || 35,663 || 59-62
|- align="center" bgcolor="bbffbb"
| 122 || August 17 || @ Braves || 8 – 7 (15) || Stammen (6-5) || Medlen (10-11) || Haren (1) || 40,866 || 60-62
|- align="center" bgcolor="ffbbbb"
| 123 || August 18 || @ Braves || 2 – 1 || Teherán (10-6) || González (7-6) || Kimbrel (39) || 27,221 || 60-63
|- align="center" bgcolor="ffbbbb"
| 124 || August 19 || @ Cubs || 11 – 1 || Samardzija (7-11) || Zimmermann (14-7) || || 31,290 || 60-64
|- align="center" bgcolor="bbffbb"
| 125 || August 20 || @ Cubs || 4 – 2 || Haren (8-11) || Rusin (2-3) || Soriano (32) || 30,975 || 61-64
|- align="center" bgcolor="bbffbb"
| 126 || August 21 || @ Cubs || 11 – 6 || Roark (3-0) || Russell (1-4) || || 31,936 || 62-64
|- align="center" bgcolor="bbffbb"
| 127 || August 22 || @ Cubs || 5 – 4 (13) || Stammen (7-5) || Bowden (1-3) || Storen (3) || 29,393 || 63-64
|- align="center" bgcolor="bbffbb"
| 128 || August 23 || @ Royals || 11 – 10 || Roark (4-0) || Chen (5-2) || Soriano (33) || 28,733 || 64-64
|- align="center" bgcolor="bbffbb"
| 129 || August 24 || @ Royals || 7 – 2 || Zimmermann (15-7) || Davis (6-10) || || 28,023 || 65-64
|- align="center" bgcolor="ffbbbb"
| 130 || August 25 || @ Royals || 6 – 4 || Herrera (5-6) || Stammen (7-6) || Holland (35) || 19,661 || 65-65
|- align="center" bgcolor="bbffbb"
| 131 || August 27 || Marlins || 2 – 1 || Ohlendorf (3-0) || Eovaldi (2-5) || Soriano (34) || 24,616 || 66-65
|- align="center" bgcolor="bbffbb"
| 132 || August 28 || Marlins || 4 – 3 || Storen (4-2) || Dunn (3-4) || Soriano (35) || 24,394 || 67-65
|- align="center" bgcolor="bbffbb"
| 133 || August 29 || Marlins || 9 – 0 || González (8-6) || Koehler (3-9) || || 27,374 || 68-65
|- align="center" bgcolor="ffbbbb"
| 134 || August 30 || Mets || 3 – 2 || Gee (10-9) || Zimmermann (15-8) || Hawkins (6) || 35,008 || 68-66
|- align="center" bgcolor="ffbbbb"
| 135 || August 31 || Mets || 11 – 3 || Wheeler (7-3) || Haren (8-12) || || 34,481 || 68-67
|-

|- align="center" bgcolor="bbffbb"
| 136 || September 1 || Mets || 6 – 5 || Davis (1-0) || Germen (1-2) || Soriano (36) || 28,995 || 69-67
|- align="center" bgcolor="ffbbbb"
| 137 || September 2 || @ Phillies || 3 – 2 || Rosenberg (2-0) || Clippard (6-3) || Papelbon (24) || 30,248 || 69-68
|- align="center" bgcolor="bbffbb"
| 138 || September 3 || @ Phillies || 9 – 6 || González (9-6) || Martin (2-4) || Soriano (37) || 28,826 || 70-68
|- align="center" bgcolor="bbffbb"
| 139 || September 4 || @ Phillies || 3 – 2 || Zimmermann (16-8) || Diekman (1-4) || Soriano (38) || 31,495 || 71-68
|- align="center" bgcolor="ffbbbb"
| 140 || September 6 || @ Marlins || 7 – 0 || Fernández (11-6) || Haren (8-13) || || 25,118 || 71-69
|- align="center" bgcolor="bbffbb"
| 141 || September 7 || @ Marlins || 9 – 2 || Roark (5-0) || Eovaldi (3-6) || || 28,336 || 72-69
|- align="center" bgcolor="bbffbb"
| 142 || September 8 || @ Marlins || 6 – 4 || Strasburg (7-9) || Turner (3-6) || Soriano (39) || 18,990 || 73-69
|- align="center" bgcolor="bbffbb"
| 143 || September 9 || @ Mets || 9 – 0 || González (10-6) || Torres (3-4) || || 20,174 || 74-69
|- align="center" bgcolor="bbffbb"
| 144 || September 10 || @ Mets || 6 – 3 || Zimmermann (17-8) || Gee (11-10) || Soriano (40) || 20,307 || 75-69
|- align="center" bgcolor="bbffbb"
| 145 || September 11 || @ Mets || 3 – 0 || Haren (9-13) || Wheeler (7-5) || Soriano (41) || 20,151 || 76-69
|- align="center" bgcolor="bbffbb"
| 146 || September 12 || @ Mets || 7 – 2 || Roark (6-0) || Harang (5-12) || || 20,484 || 77-69
|- align="center" bgcolor="bbffbb"
| 147 || September 13 || Phillies || 6 – 1 || Ohlendorf (4-0) || Kendrick (10-13) || || 31,325 || 78-69
|- align="center" bgcolor="ffbbbb"
| 148 || September 14 || Phillies || 5 – 4 || Hamels (8-13) || González (10-7) || Papelbon (27) || 33,972 || 78-70
|- align="center" bgcolor="bbffbb"
| 149 || September 15 || Phillies || 11 – 2 || Zimmermann (18-8) || Cloyd (2-5) || || 33,746 || 79-70
|- align="center" bgcolor="bbbbbb"
| – || September 16 || Braves || colspan=6| Postponed (Washington Navy Yard shooting) Rescheduled for September 17 as part of a doubleheader
|- align="center" bgcolor="bbffbb"
| 150 || September 17 (1) || Braves || 6 – 5 || Krol (2-1) || Kimbrel (3-3) || || 25,066 || 80-70
|- align="center" bgcolor="bbffbb"
| 151 || September 17 (2) || Braves || 4 – 0 || Roark (7-0) || García (4-7) || || 28,369 || 81-70
|- align="center" bgcolor="ffbbbb"
| 152 || September 18 || Braves || 5 – 2 || Loe (2-3) || Ohlendorf (4-1) || Kimbrel (48) || 30,636 || 81-71
|- align="center" bgcolor="bbffbb"
| 153 || September 19 || Marlins || 3 – 2 || González (11-7) || Álvarez (4-5) || Soriano (42) || 25,945 || 82-71
|- align="center" bgcolor="bbffbb"
| 154 || September 20 || Marlins || 8 – 0 || Zimmermann (19-8) || Turner (3-8) || || 34,752 || 83-71
|- align="center" bgcolor="bbbbbb"
| – || September 21 || Marlins || colspan=6| Postponed (rain) Rescheduled for September 22 as part of a doubleheader
|- align="center" bgcolor="ffbbbb"
| 155 || September 22 (1) || Marlins || 4 – 2 || Koehler (4-10) || Haren (9-14) || Cishek (32) || 35,101 || 83-72
|- align="center" bgcolor="bbffbb"
| 156 || September 22 (2) || Marlins || 5 – 4 || Soriano (3-3) || Dyson (0-2) || || 34,824 || 84-72
|- align="center" bgcolor="ffbbbb"
| 157 || September 23 || @ Cardinals || 4 – 3 || Wainwright (18-9) || Roark (7-1) || Rosenthal (1) || 39,783 || 84-73
|- align="center" bgcolor="ffbbbb"
| 158 || September 24 || @ Cardinals || 2 – 0 || Wacha (4-1) || González (11-8) || Rosenthal (2) || 38,940 || 84-74
|- align="center" bgcolor="ffbbbb"
| 159 || September 25 || @ Cardinals || 4 – 1 || Miller (15-9) || Zimmermann (19-9) || Rosenthal (3) || 40,597 || 84-75
|- align="center" bgcolor="bbffbb"
| 160 || September 27 || @ Diamondbacks || 8 – 4 || Strasburg (8-9) || Corbin (14-8) || || 31,037 || 85-75
|- align="center" bgcolor="bbffbb"
| 161 || September 28 || @ Diamondbacks || 2 – 0 || Haren (10-14) || McCarthy (5-11) || Soriano (43) || 29,673 || 86-75
|- align="center" bgcolor="ffbbbb"
| 162 || September 29 || @ Diamondbacks || 3 – 2 || Hernández (5-6) || Mattheus (0-2) || Ziegler (13) || 30,420 || 86-76
|-

Roster

Statistics
Both tables are sortable.

Batting
Note: POS = Position; G = Games played; AB = At bats; R = Runs scored; H = Hits; 2B = Doubles; 3B = Triples; HR = Home runs; RBI = Runs batted in; AVG = Batting average; SB = Stolen bases

Complete offensive statistics can be found here.

Pitching
Note: POS = Position; G = Games pitched; GS = Games started; IP = Innings pitched; W = Wins; L = Losses; SV = Saves; HLD = Holds; ERA = Earned run average; SO= Strikeouts; WHIP = Walks and hits per inning pitched

Complete pitching statistics can be found here.

Team leaders

Qualifying players only.

Batting

Pitching

Awards and honors

All-Stars
 Bryce Harper, OF
 Jordan Zimmermann, P

Jordan Zimmermann did not appear in the 2013 Major League Baseball All-Star Game due to injury.

Annual awards
 Silver Slugger: Ian Desmond, SS

Ian Desmond became the second Washington Nationals player to win two Silver Slugger Awards. The first was third baseman Ryan Zimmermann, who won Silver Slugger Awards in 2009 and 2010.

Farm system

LEAGUE CHAMPIONS: GCL Nationals

References

External links

 2013 Washington Nationals Season Official Site 
 2013 Washington Nationals season at Baseball Reference

Washington Nationals seasons
Washington Nationals
Washington Nationals